The Cecil Baker Round Barn near Kensal, North Dakota, United States, was a round barn built in 1921.  It was listed on the National Register of Historic Places in 1986.  It was demolished in 2010 and delisted from the National Register the following year.

It was apparently a kit barn purchased from the Gordon–Van Tine company, "a pre-cut home and farm building supplier" in Davenport, Iowa.

See also 
 Gordon–Van Tine Company Historic District

References

Barns on the National Register of Historic Places in North Dakota
Buildings and structures completed in 1921
Round barns in North Dakota
National Register of Historic Places in Stutsman County, North Dakota
Demolished buildings and structures in North Dakota
Former National Register of Historic Places in North Dakota
1921 establishments in North Dakota